Port Saunders is a community of 674 located in Newfoundland and Labrador, Canada.

Demographics 

See also
 List of cities and towns in Newfoundland and Labrador

References

External links
Port Saunders Town website
Port Saunders - Encyclopedia of Newfoundland and Labrador, vol. 4, p. 399-401.

Populated coastal places in Canada
Towns in Newfoundland and Labrador